Griffith Creek is an unincorporated community in Marion County, Tennessee, United States. It lies along the edge of the Cumberland Plateau, about midway between Palmer and Whitwell. Tennessee State Route 108 traverses the community.

References

Unincorporated communities in Tennessee
Unincorporated communities in Marion County, Tennessee